April 29 - Eastern Orthodox liturgical calendar - May 1

All fixed commemorations below celebrated on May 13 by Orthodox Churches on the Old Calendar.

For April 30th, Orthodox Churches on the Old Calendar commemorate the Saints listed on April 17.

Saints

 Holy Apostle James (44), the brother of St. John the Theologian.
 Hieromartyr Maximus, at Ephesus, during the persecution of Decius.
 Hieromartyr Aphrodisius, and 30 martyrs, at Alexandria.
 Saint Donatus, Bishop of Euroea in Epirus (387)
 Saint Clement the Hymnographer, abbot of the Studion (9th century)

Pre-Schism Western saints

 Martyr Sophia of Fermo (c. 250)
 Martyrs Marianus, James and Companions, at Lambaesis, an ancient town in Numidia in North Africa (259)
 Martyrs Eutropius and Estelle, of Saintes (Gaul) (3rd century)
 Saint Quintian and Saint Atticus
 Hieromartyr Laurence, at Novara, and some boys whom he was teaching (397)
 Saint Pomponius of Naples, Bishop of Naples in Italy (508-536) and a strong opponent of Arianism (536)
 Saint Desideratus of Gourdon, hermit (c. 569)
 Saint Cynwl of Wales, Hermit, brother of Saint Deiniol and first Bishop of Bangor (6th century)
 Saint Erconwald, Bishop of London (693)
 Saint Swithbert the Younger, Bishop of Werden in Westphalia (807)
 Martyrs Amator, Peter and Louis (Ludovicus) of Cordoba, Spain, by the Emirate for blaspheming Islam (855)
 Martyrs Isidore, Elias and Paul of Cordoba, Spain, by the Moors (856) (see also: April 17)
 Saint Forannan, Abbot of Waulsort Abbey in Belgium (982)

Post-Schism Orthodox saints

 Saint Simon, Metropolitan of Moscow (1511)
Schema-abbess Martha Protasieva, disciple of Saint Paisius Velichkovsky (1813)
 Saint Ignatius Brianchaninov, Bishop of the Caucasus and Stavropol (1867)

Icons

 Icon of the Most Holy Theotokos "Of the Passion" (1641)

Other commemorations

 Uncovering of the relics of Saint Basil of Amasea, Bishop (322)
 Uncovering of the relics (1558) of Saint Nicetas of Novgorod, bishop (1108)
 Uncovering of the relics (1725) of New martyr Argyra of Prussa (1721)
 Repose of Schema-Abbess Martha (Protasieva) (1813), disciple of St. Paisius (Velichkovsky).
 Repose of Hieromonk Clement (Sederholm) of Optina Monastery (1878)
 Slaying of Priest Igor Rozin of Tyrnyauz, Kabardino-Balkar Republic, Russia (2001)

Icon gallery

Notes

References

Sources
 April 30/May 13. Orthodox Calendar (Pravoslavie.ru).
 May 13, 2011 / April 30. Holy Trinity Russian Orthodox Church (A parish of the Patriarchate of Moscow).
 April 30. OCA - The Lives of the Saints.
 April 30. Latin Saints of the Orthodox Patriarchate of Rome.
 The Roman Martyrology. Transl. by the Archbishop of Baltimore. Last Edition, According to the Copy Printed at Rome in 1914. Revised Edition, with the Imprimatur of His Eminence Cardinal Gibbons. Baltimore: John Murphy Company, 1916. pp. 121-122.
 Rev. Richard Stanton. A Menology of England and Wales, or, Brief Memorials of the Ancient British and English Saints Arranged According to the Calendar, Together with the Martyrs of the 16th and 17th Centuries. London: Burns & Oates, 1892. pp. 186-189.
Greek Sources
 Great Synaxaristes:  30 Απριλίου, Μέγας Συναξαριστής.
  Συναξαριστής. 30 Απριλίου. Ecclesia.gr. (H Εκκλησία της Ελλάδος).
Russian Sources
  13 мая (30 апреля). Православная Энциклопедия под редакцией Патриарха Московского и всея Руси Кирилла (электронная версия). (Orthodox Encyclopedia - Pravenc.ru).
  30 апреля (ст.ст.) 13 мая 2013 (нов. ст.) . Русская Православная Церковь Отдел внешних церковных связей. (DECR).

April in the Eastern Orthodox calendar